Proteromonadidae is a paraphyletic family of heterokonts, that resemble Opalinidae.

References

Placidozoa
Heterokont families